Slaheddine Deguechi (born 20 October 1954) is a Tunisian handball player. He competed in the men's tournament at the 1976 Summer Olympics.

References

External links
 

1954 births
Living people
Tunisian male handball players
Olympic handball players of Tunisia
Handball players at the 1976 Summer Olympics
Place of birth missing (living people)